Ahmed Bouazza (born 1940) is a Moroccan boxer. He competed in the men's bantamweight event at the 1960 Summer Olympics.

References

1940 births
Living people
Moroccan male boxers
Olympic boxers of Morocco
Boxers at the 1960 Summer Olympics
People from Tétouan
Bantamweight boxers